The men's 110 metres hurdles competition at the 2018 Asian Games took place on 27 and 28 August 2018 at the Gelora Bung Karno Stadium, Jakarta, Indonesia.

Schedule
All times are Western Indonesia Time (UTC+07:00)

Records

Results

Round 1
 Qualification: First 2 in each heat (Q) and the next 2 fastest (q) advance to the final.

Heat 1 
 Wind: −0.3 m/s

Heat 2 
 Wind: −1.5 m/s

Heat 3 
 Wind: −0.5 m/s

Final 
 Wind: 0.0 m/s

References

External links
Results

Hurdles 110
2018 men